Richard Driscoll (born 13 January 1960) is a British screenwriter, film producer, actor and film director.

Driscoll was born in Cardiff, and uses the professional name Steven Craine, to avoid confusion with Richard Driscoll, another British actor.

Eldorado
Eldorado, which starred Daryl Hannah, David Carradine and Michael Madsen, was filmed mostly at Higher Nanpean Farm in Cornwall, a small production facility owned by Driscoll. However scenes involving Daryl Hannah were shot in Los Angeles. During production, Michael Madsen was hospitalised during production after an incident while intoxicated. The film was a released in 2012.

Legal history

Tax fraud conviction
Once Eldorado was released, HM Revenue and Customs began an investigation into Driscoll and the production accounting of the film. Driscoll had greatly inflated the budget of the film to claim VAT refunds on money the production had not spent. The entire budget of the film was reported by Driscoll to be £12 million but the subsequent investigation revealed it had only cost £750,000. False invoices were created to give the impression that Carradine was paid more than £400,000 for 13 days' filming, even though he had died two weeks earlier than the filming dates stated. Other false invoices claimed Daryl Hannah was purportedly paid £575,000 for seven days' shooting at and travel to Driscoll's studio in Cornwall, even though all of her scenes were shot in Los Angeles. Another showed Rik Mayall received £44,350 for four days' filming when his fee was actually £6,000 for two days.

In June 2013, Driscoll was found guilty of a £1.5 million VAT fraud involving inflating the values of invoices for projects including Eldorado, and two other films, Watchmen of Hellgate and Back2Hell. But, he was acquitted of conspiring to claim more than £2 million in film tax credit subsidies for Eldorado. He was subsequently jailed for three years. Since his release, he has continued to write, act and direct with Ross Fall and his MAHA Films Label. Since his conviction, he has continued to work under his pseudonyms Steven Craine and Chris Newman.

Sexual misconduct allegations
In 2018, in the wake of allegations against Harvey Weinstein, Driscoll was accused of sexual misconduct by two women. Despite the accusations, he is currently working on a mini-series, Buckle-Up, from MAHA Films and executive producers Red Rock Entertainment.

Filmography

Director 
 The Comic (1985) (+ screenplay)
 Silent Heroes (1988) (+ screenplay)
 Kannibal (2001) (+ screenplay)
 Evil Calls: The Raven (2008) (+ screenplay)
 Eldorado (2012) (+ screenplay)
 Grindhouse 2wo (2016) (+ screenplay)
 Grindhouse Nightmare (2017)
 Assassins Revenge (2018) (+ screenplay)
 Born2Race (2019) (+ screenplay)
 Conjuring: The Book of the Dead (2020) (+ screenplay)

Actor 
 The Life and Times of David Lloyd George (TV series, 1 episode) (1981) – Lord Askwith
 It Ain't Half Hot Mum (TV series, 1 episode) (1981) – Private Jones
 Star Wars: Episode VI – Return of the Jedi (1983) – Unidentified X-wing pilot
 Jamaica Inn (1983) (TV film) – Sedgewick
 The Mimosa Boys (1984) (TV film) – Griffin
 The Master of Ballantrae (1984) (TV film) – McGregor
 The District Nurse (TV series, 3 episodes) (1984) – John Morris
 La Guerre de Jenny (1985) (TV film) – Stanson* Kannibal (2001) – Quinn/Kavanagh/Virgil
 Evil Calls (2008) – George Carney
 Eldorado (2012) – Oliver Rosenblum
 Assassins Revenge (2018)- The Comedian / William Bard

References 

1951 births
Living people
Welsh film directors
Welsh male film actors
Welsh screenwriters
Welsh film producers
People from Cornwall
Prisoners and detainees of the United Kingdom
Welsh fraudsters